This is a list of educational institutions in Ghazipur.
 Crescent Convent School, Dildarnagar 
 Jawahar Navodaya vidyalaya Ghazipur 
 Shah Faiz Public School, Ghazipur
 New Shah Faiz Public School, Dildarnagar
 Sayed Kamsar-O-Bar Muslim Degree College, Dildarnagar
 Basheer Khan Girls Degree College, Usia, Dildarnagar
 Noble Senior Secondary School, Dildarnagar
 Shri Jokhan Janta Inter College, Ikara Kudva, Sadat, Ghazipur
 St. John's School
 Post Graduate College, Ghazipur
 
 Adarsh Vidyalaya Inter College, Dildarnagar
 Government City Inter College, Ghazipur
 Hindu PG College
 M.A.H. Inter College
 Shri Arjun Yadav Inter College Ikara Kudva, Sadat, Ghazipur 
 M.J.R. Phule Public School, Jagdishpuram, Ghazipur
 Merry City school Ghazipur
 Mount Litera Zee School
 S M R B D I C Bhurkura Ghazipur 
 Shahid Smarak Inter College Nandganj Ghazipur
 Shree Ramdas Balika Inter College, Medanipur, Karanda, Ghazipur
 Sri Suresh Inter College
 St. Mary's School, Zamania, Ghazipur
Government Homeopathic Medical College, Ghazipur
Sham-e-Hussaini Institute of Nursing & Para Medical College, Ghazipur
Subhash Inter College Fatehullahpur Ghazipur

References

Lists of universities and colleges in Uttar Pradesh
Institutions 
Ghazipur